A historical sovereign state is a state that once existed, but has since been dissolved due to conflict, war, rebellion, annexation, or uprising. This page lists sovereign states, countries, nations, or empires that ceased to exist as political entities sometime after 1453, grouped geographically and by constitutional nature.

Criteria for inclusion
The criteria for inclusion in this list are similar to that of the list of states with limited recognition. To be included here, a polity must have claimed statehood and either:
 had de facto control over a territory, a population, a government, a capacity to enter into relations with other states, or
 have been recognised as a state by at least one other state.

This is not a list for all variant governments of a state, nor is it a list of variations of countries' official long form name.
For purposes of this list, the cutoff between medieval and early modern states is the fall of Constantinople in 1453.

Ancient and medieval states
 List of Copper Age states
 List of Bronze Age states
 List of Classical Age states
 List of Iron Age states
 List of states during Late Antiquity
 List of states during the Middle Ages

Modern states and territories by geography

Africa

Morocco (Maghreb al-Aqsa)
  Marinid Sultanate (1244–1465)
  Wattasid dynasty (1472–1549)
  Saadi Sultanate (1510–1649)
  Republic of Salé (1627–1668)
  'Alawi dynasty (1631–1912)
  Republic of the Rif (1921–1926)

Egypt, Sudan and Libya
  Makuria (5th century–1518)
  Alodia (6th century–1504)
  Mamluk Sultanate (1250–1517)
  Egypt Eyalet (1517–1867)
 Kingdom of Fazughli (–1685)
  Sultanate of Sennar (1504–1821)
  Sultanate of Darfur (1603–1874/1898–1916)
  Mahdist State (1885–1899)
  Tripolitanian Republic (1918–1922)
  Emirate of Cyrenaica (1949–1951)
  United Arab Republic (1958–1971)

Algeria (Central Maghreb)
  Hafsid dynasty (1229–1574)
  Kingdom of Tlemcen (1235–1556)
  Kingdom of Kuku (1515–1638)
  Kingdom of Beni Abbas (1510–1871)
  Sultanate of Tuggurt (1414–1871)
  Regency of Algiers (1516–1830)
  Emirate of Abdelkader (1832–1847)

Comoro Islands 
  Ali Soilih Regime (1976–1978)
  State of Anjouan (1997–2002), (2007–2008)

Madagascar 
  Kingdom of Antankarana – made a French protectorate in 1843, annexed in 1895
  Kingdom of Antongil (1773–1786)
  Kingdom of Boina (–1840)
  Kingdom of Menabe (–1834)
  Kingdom of Imerina (1540–1897)
  Kingdom of Tamatave (1712–1828)
  Kingdom of Tanibe (1822–1828)

Sub-Saharan Africa
  Bornu Empire (–1893)
  Shilluk Kingdom (15th century–1861)
 Wadai Empire (1501–1912)
 Kingdom of Baguirmi (1480/1522–1897)

Horn of Africa 
 Medri Bahri (–1879)
  Adal Sultanate (1415–1559)
  Imamate of Aussa (16th century–1750)
  Aussa Sultanate (1734–1936)
  Isaaq Sultanate (1750–1884)
 Habr Yunis Sultanate (–1907)
  Ajuran Sultanate (13th century–17th century)
  Sultanate of Hobyo (1878–1925)
  Majeerteen Sultanate (–1924)
 Sultanate of the Geledi (17th century–1910)
 Kingdom of Kaffa (–1897)
 Hadiya Sultanate (13th century–15th century)
 Welayta Kingdom (–1894)
 Kingdom of Janjero (c.15th century–1894)
 Kingdom of Gumma (–1902)
 Kingdom of Gomma (– 1886)
 Kingdom of Gera (–1887)
 Kingdom of Jimma (1790–1932)
 Ennarea (14th century–)
 Kingdom of Limmu-Ennarea (1801–1891)
 Emirate of Harar (1647–1887)
  State of Somaliland (1960)

Western Africa 
 Emirate of Trarza (1640–1902)
 Emirate of Tagant
 Emirate of Brakna
  Mali Empire (–1672)
 Bamana Empire (1712–1861)
 Khasso (17th century–19th century)
 Sultanate of Agadez (1449–1900)
 Songhai Empire (–1591)
 Mossi States
 Gurunsi (–1899)
 Gwiriko Kingdom (1714–1897)
 Liptako (1718–1897, fully disestablished 1963)
 Tenkodogo (–1897)
 Wogodogo (1182?–1897)
 Yatenga (?–1895)
 Bilanga
 Bilayanga
 Bongandini
 Con
 Macakoali
 Piela
 Nungu (1204–1895)
 Zabarma Emirate (1860–1897)
  Sokoto Caliphate (1804–1903)
 Sultanate of Damagaram (1731–1851)
 Empire of Great Fulo (Denanke Kingdom) (1490–1776)
 Imamate of Futa Toro (1725–1861)
 Jolof Empire (1350–1549)
 Kingdom of Jolof (1549–1875)
 Kingdom of Sine (c. 1520–1867, fully disestablished 1969)
 Kingdom of Saloum (1494–1864, fully disestablished 1969)
 Kingdom of Baol (1555–1895)
 Kingdom of Cayor (1549–1879)
 Kingdom of Waalo (1287–1855)
 Bundu (?–1858)
 Kaabu (1537–1867)
  Imamate of Futa Jallon (1725–1912)
 Toucouleur Empire (1861–1890)
  Wassoulou Empire (1878–1898)
 Kong Empire (1710–1898)
 Kingdom of Dagbon (–1899?)
  Ashanti Empire (1670/1701–1902)
 Bonoman (11th century–20th century)
 Gyaaman (–1895)
 Denkyira (–1701)
 Mankessim Kingdom (1252–1844)
 Fante Confederacy (16th century–1873)
 Kingdom of Whydah ( - 1727)
  Kingdom of Dahomey (–1904)
 Oyo Empire (–1896)
 Kingdom of Benin (1180–1897)
 Kingdom of Nri (10th century?–1911)
  Aro Confederacy (1690–1902)
 Kwararafa
  Thomas Sankara's Burkina Faso government (1984–1987)
  People's Revolutionary Republic of Guinea (1979–1984)
  Republic of Maryland (1854–1857)
  Republic of Dahomey (1958–1975)
  Republic of Benin (September 19, 1967 – September 20, 1967)
  Biafra (1967–1970)

African Great Lakes 
  Buganda (14th century–1894, still exists as traditional kingdom)
  Bunyoro (13th century–1897, still exists as traditional kingdom)
  Ankole (1478–1901, fully disestablished 1967)
  Toro Kingdom (1830–1876, still exists as traditional kingdom)
  Busoga (?–1906, still exists as traditional kingdom)
 Kingdom of Rwanda (11th century–1885, fully disestablished 1962)
  Kingdom of Burundi (1680–1890/1962–1966)
 Kingdom of Karagwe

Eastern Africa 
 Pate Sultanate (1203–1870)
 Malindi Kingdom (9th century–15th century)
 Mombasa Sultanate (1502–1887, fully disestablished 1963)
  Witu Sultanate (–1905/1923)
 Kilwa Sultanate (957–1513)
 Kingdom of Maravi (–1891)
  Sultanate of Zanzibar (pre–1503/4, 1856–1890, 1963–1964)
  People's Republic of Zanzibar (1964)
  Tanganyika (1961–1964)

Central Africa
  Kingdom of Loango
 Yaka Kingdom (17th century–18th century)
 Anziku Kingdom (?–19th century)
  Kingdom of Kongo (1390–1914)
 Kuba Kingdom (1625–1884)
 Kingdom of Luba (1585–1889)
 Kingdom of Lunda (–1887)
 Yeke Kingdom (1856–1891)
 Kingdom of Ndongo (16th century–1671)
 Kasanje Kingdom (1620–1910)
 Kingdom of Matamba (1631–1744)
 Mbunda Kingdom (1700–1914)
 Chokwe Kingdom
 Kazembe Kingdom (c. 1740 - 1894)
 International Association of the Congo (1879–1885)
  Congo Free State (1885–1908)
  Republic of Zaire (1971–1997)

Southern Africa
 Kingdom of Barotseland (19th century)
  Kingdom of Mutapa (1430–1760)
 Kingdom of Zimbabwe (1220–1450)
 Kingdom of Butua (1450–)
 Rozvi Empire (1660–1889)
 Kingdom of Mthwakazi (1823–1894)
 Ndebele Kingdom
 Gaza Empire (1824–1895)
 Mthethwa Empire (–1817)
  Zulu Kingdom (1816–1897)
  South African Republic (Transvaal) (1856–1877, 1881–1902)
  Orange Free State (1854–1902)
  Griqualand East (1862-1874)
  Nieuwe Republiek (1884–1888)
  Natalia Republic (1839–1843)
  State of Goshen (1882–1883)
  Republic of Stellaland (1882–1885)
  United States of Stellaland (1883–1885)
  Republic of Upingtonia (1885–1887)
  Bophuthatswana (1977–1994)
  Ciskei (1981–1994)
  Transkei (1976–1994)
  Venda (1979–1994)
  (1965–1979)
  (1979)

Asia

Central Asia
  Chagatai Khanate (1225–1680)
 Kart dynasty (1244–1381)
 Uzbek Khanate (1428–1471)
 Nogai Horde (1440–1634)
 Kazakh Khanate (1465–1848)
 Khanate of Bukhara (1506–1785)
 Dzungar Khanate (1634–1755)
 Khanate of Kokand (1709–1868)
  Emirate of Bukhara (1785–1873)
  Alash Autonomy (1917–1918)
  Turkestan Autonomy (1917–1918)
  Khanate of Khiva (1511–1920)
  Confederated Republic of Altai (1918–1920)
  Bukharan People's Soviet Republic (1920–1925)
  Khorezm People's Soviet Republic (1920–1925)
  First East Turkestan Republic (1933–1934)
  Second East Turkestan Republic (1944–1949)

East Asia
  Ashikaga shogunate (1336–1573)
  Ming dynasty (1368–1644)
  Kingdom of Tungning (1661–1683)
  Republic of China (based on mainland China 1912–1949; continued existence on Taiwan since 1949 – internationally recognized until 1971)
  Azuchi–Momoyama (1568–1600)
  Tokugawa shogunate (1603–1868)
  Jaxa (1665–1674)
  Republic of Ezo (1869)
  Republic of Formosa (1895)
  Hunan Soviet in a continental Chinese province (1927)
  Jiangxi Soviet (1931–1937)
  People's Revolutionary Government of the Republic of China (1933–1934)
  Hunan Soviet (1927)
  Guangzhou Commune (1927)
  Jiangxi–Fujian Soviet (1931–1934)
  Allied Occupied Japan (1945–1952)
  Soviet Zone of China (1927–1949)
  Manchukuo (1932–1945)
  Qing dynasty (1636–1912)
  East Hebei Autonomous Government (1935–1938)
  Mengjiang United Autonomous Government (1939–1945)
  Shanghai Great Way Government (1937–1938)
  Inner Mongolian People's Republic (1945)
  Ryukyu Kingdom (1429–1879)
  Taiping Heavenly Kingdom (1851–1864)
  Tibet under Ganden Phodrang government (1644–1720)
  Tibet (1912–1951)
  Tibetan states (900–1240, 1300–1620)
  Tuvan People's Republic (1921–1944)
 Uryankhay Republic (1911–1914)
  Uryankhay Krai (1914)

Korean Peninsula 
  Joseon (1392–1897)
  Korean Empire (1897–1910)
 Korean People's Association in Manchuria (1929–1931)

West Asia

Afghanistan 
  Hotak dynasty (1709–1738)
  Durrani Empire (1747–1826)
  Islamic Emirate of Badakhshan (1996)
  Islamic Emirate of Kunar (1991)

Anatolia
  Beylik of Isfendiyar (1292–1461)
  Alaiye (1293–1471)
 Beylik of Bafra (14th century–1460)
  Empire of Trebizond (1204–1461)
 Beylik of Alaiye (1293–1471)
 Beylik of Karaman (1250–1487)
 Beylik of Dulkadir (1337–1522)
 Ramadanid Emirate (1352–1608)
 Aq Qoyunlu (1378–1501)
 Kara Koyunlu (1374–1468)
 Emirate of Hasankeyf (1232–1524)
  Kars Republic (1918–1919)
  Ottoman Empire (–1923)

Cyprus
  Kingdom of Cyprus (1192–1489)

Mesopotamia
  Kingdom of Kurdistan (1922–1924)
  All-Palestine Government (1948–1967)
  Arab Federation (1958)

Persia
 Kar-Kiya dynasty (1370s–1592)
 Baduspanids (665–1598)
 Marashiyan dynasty (1359–1596)
 Afrasiyab dynasty (1349–1504)
 Mihrabanid dynasty (1236–1537)
  Timurid Empire (1370–1507)
  Safavid Iran (1501–1736)
  Afsharid dynasty (1736–1796)
  Zand dynasty (1751–1794)
  Persian Soviet Socialist Republic in Gilan (Iran) (1920–1921)
  Azerbaijan People's Government (1941–1946)
  Republic of Mahabad (1946–1947)

Levant
  Arab Kingdom of Syria (1920)
  United Arab Republic (1958–1971)
  Free Lebanon State (1979–1984)
  Islamic State (2014–2017)

Arabian Peninsula
  Sheikhdom of Kuwait (1613–1961)
  Bani Khalid Emirate (1669–1796)
  Emirate of Diriyah (1744–1812)
  Emirate of Nejd (1812–1891)
  Muscat and Oman (1820–1970)
  Emirate of Jabal Shammar (1836–1921)
  Emirate of Riyadh (1902–1913)
  Idrisid Emirate of Asir (1906–1934)
  Sheikdom of Upper Asir (1916–1920)
  Emirate of Nejd and Hasa (1913–1921)
  Sultanate of Nejd (1921–1925)
  Kingdom of Hejaz (1916–1925)
  Kingdom of Hejaz and Nejd (1926–1932)
  Mutawakkilite Kingdom of Yemen (1918–1962)
  Fadhli Sultanate (15th century–1888)
  Qu'aiti Sultanate in Hadhramaut (1858–1888)
  Sultanate of Upper Yafa (1800–1903)
  Sultanate of Lower Yafa (1800–1895)
  Emirate of Beihan (1680–1872)
  Emirate of Dhala (15th century–1904)
  Wahidi Sultanate of Balhaf (1640–1888)
  Wahidi Sultanate of Haban (1640–1895)
  Kathiri Sultanate in Hadhramaut (14th century–1888)
  Mahra State of Qishn and Socotra (1432–1886)
  Sultanate of Lahej (1728–1839)
  Federation of South Arabia (1962–1967)
  Republic of Kuwait (1990)

South Asia
  Garhwal Kingdom (823–1949)
  Kingdom of Cochin (Before 12th century CE–1949)
  Delhi Sultanate (1206–1526)
 Sur Empire (1540–1556)
 Laur Kingdom (600–1565)
  Bengal Sultanate (1352–1576)
 Jaunpur Sultanate (1394–1479)
  Kingdom of Mysore (1399–1948)
 Bijapur Sultanate (Adil Shahi dynasty, 1490–1686)
 Pratapgarh Kingdom (1489–1700s)
  Bengal Subah (1717–1757)
  Maratha Empire (1674–1820)
 Jaintia Kingdom (500–1835)
  Sikh Empire (1799–1849)
  Mughal Empire (1526–1857)
  Provisional Government of Free India (1943–1945)
  Hyderabad State (1724–1798)
  Travancore (1729–1949)
  Udaipur State (734–1818)
  Manikya dynasty (1400–1761)
  United Suvadive Republic (1959–1963)
  Sultanate of Maldives (1117–1796), (1954–1968)
  Sikkim (1642–1975)

Southeast Asia
 Kingdom of Cambodia (1431–1863)
  Kingdom of Kampuchea (1945)
 In Laos:
  Kingdom of Luang Phrabang (1707–1893)
 Kingdom of Vientiane (1707–1828)
  Kingdom of Champasak (1713–1904)
  Kingdom of Luang Phrabang (1945)
  Lao Issara (1945–1946)
 In Vietnam:
 Champa kingdom (192–1832)
 Đại Việt (968–1407/1428–1804)
  Nghệ-Tĩnh Soviet (1930–1931)
  Empire of Vietnam (1945)
  Democratic Republic of Vietnam (North Vietnam) (1945–1976)
  Republic of Cochinchina (1946-1949)
  Provisional Central Government of Vietnam (1948-1949)
  State of Vietnam (known as South Vietnam after the Geneva Conference of 1954) (1949–1955)
  Republic of Vietnam (South Vietnam) (1955–1975)
  Republic of South Vietnam (1975–1976)
 In Burma (Myanmar):
 Mon kingdoms (9th–11th, 13th–16th, 18th centuries)
  Hanthawaddy Kingdom (1287–1552)
 Ava (1364–1555)
 Pegu (1287–1539, 1747–1757)
 Kingdom of Mrauk U (1429–1785)
  Taungoo dynasty (1486–1752, 2nd Empire)
  Konbaung dynasty (1752–1885, 3rd Empire)
  Shan States (1287–1557)
 Arakan (1287–1784)
  State of Burma (1943–1945)
 In Thailand:
 Langkasuka (2nd–15th century)
 Sultanate of Singora (1605–1680)
  Ayutthaya Kingdom (1350–1767)
  Thonburi Kingdom (1767–1782)
 Nakhon Si Thammarat Kingdom (13th century–1782)
 Lan Na (1292–1775)
 Kingdom of Chiang Mai (1782–1894)
  Pattani kingdom (1516–1902)
  Kingdom of Setul Mambang Segara (1808–1916)
  Kingdom of Siam (1782–1932)
 In Indonesia:
  Republic of Indonesia (1945–1949)
  United States of Indonesia (1949–1950)
  State of East Indonesia (1946–1950)
  State of East Java (1948–1950)
  State of East Sumatra (1947–1950)
  State of Madura (1948–1950)
  State of Pasundan (1948–1950)
  State of South Sumatra (1948–1950)
  Great Dayak (1946–1950)
  West Kalimantan (1946–1950)
 In Sumatra:
  Sultanate of Aceh (1496–1903)
  Sultanate of Siak Sri Indrapura
 Jambi Sultanate (? - late 19th century)
 Palembang Sultanate (1659–1823)
  Sultanate of Deli (1609–1862, fully disestablished 1956)
  Sultanate of Langkat (1568–1946)
  Sultanate of Serdang (1723 - 1946)
 In Java:
  Majapahit (1293–1527)
  Sultanate of Mataram (1588–1681)
  Sultanate of Banten (1527–1813)
  Sultanate of Cirebon (1445–1677)
 Sultanate of Demak (1475–1548)
 Kingdom of Pajang (1568–1586)
 In Lesser Sunda Islands
  Bali Kingdoms (914–1908)
  Bima Sultanate (1620–1669, fully disestablished 1958)
 Kingdom of Larantuka (1515–1904)
 In Sulawesi:
 Kingdom of Banggai (? - 1907)
  Sultanate of Gowa (14th century–1911, fully disestablished 1945)
  Sultanate of Bone (14th century - 1905)
 Kingdom of Wajoq (–1906, fully disestablished 1957)
 In Maluku:
   Sultanate of Ternate (1257–1914)
 In Borneo:
  Bruneian Empire (1368–1888)
 Sambas Sultanate (1609–1819, fully disestablished 1956)
  Pontianak Sultanate (1771–1779)
  Kingdom of Sarawak (1841–1888)
 Berau Sultanate
  Sultanate of Bulungan (1731–, fully disestablished 1964)
Kingdom of Kutai Martadipura (399–1635)
Sultanate of Kutai Kartanegara (1300–1844)
  Sultanate of Banjar (1526–1860)
  Lanfang Republic (1777–1884)
 In Riau Islands:
  Riau-Lingga Sultanate (1824–1911)
 In Malaysia:
 Sultanate of Malacca (1400–1511)
 Johor Sultanate (1528–1855)
 Pahang Sultanate (1470–1623)
  Pahang Kingdom (1770–1881)
  Malayan Union (1946–1948)
  Federation of Malaya (1957–1963)
 In the Philippines
  Sultanate of Maguindanao (1500–1888)
  Sultanate of Sulu (1405–1915)
  Republic of Negros (1898–1899)
  Cantonal Government of Negros (1898–1901)
  Tejeros Revolutionary Government (1897)
  Sovereign Tagalog Nation (1896–1897)
  First Philippine Republic (1899–1902)
  Tagalog Republic (1902–1906)
  Second Philippine Republic (1943–1945)

Europe

Nordic countries
In the Nordic countries, unions were personal, not unitary
  Icelandic Commonwealth (c. 930–1262)
 Kingdom of Finland (1742–1743)
  Kingdom of Finland (1918–1919)
  Finnish Socialist Workers' Republic (1918–1919)
  United Kingdoms of Sweden and Norway (1814–1905)
  Kingdom of Norway (1814)
  Denmark–Norway (1524–1814, intermittent)
  Kalmar Union (1397–1523, intermittent)
  Schleswig (1058–1864)

Modern France
  Kingdom of France (843–1792) (1814/15–1848)
  Duchy of Brittany (939–1532)
  Duchy of Burgundy (918–1482)
  Duchy of Normandy (911–1259/1469)
  Duchy of Lorraine (959–1766)
  Viscounty of Béarn (9th century–1620)
  Free City of Danzig (1807–1814)
  Duchy of Warsaw (1807–1815)
  Territory of the Saar Basin (1920–1935)
  Vichy France (1940–1944)
  Saar Protectorate (1946–1956)
  Kingdom of Corsica (1736)
  Corsican Republic (1755–1769)
  Anglo-Corsican Kingdom (1794–1796)
  County of Foix (1010–1607)
  Free Cities of Menton and Roquebrune (1848–1849)
  Paris Commune (1871)

Modern Germany
  Holy Roman Empire (843–1806)
  Confederation of the Rhine (1806–1813)
  Duchy of Anhalt (1806–1918)
  Principality of Reuss-Gera (1806–1918)
  Grand Duchy of Frankfurt (1810–1813)
  German Confederation (1815–1866)
  German Empire (1848–1849)
  North German Federation (1867–1871)
  (1948–1990), Western Bloc-aligned political enclave
  German Democratic Republic (1949–1990) (also known as East Germany or GDR), its states acceded to Federal Republic of Germany in 1990)
  Alsace Soviet Republic (1918)
  Baden (Grand Duchy – 1806–1871)
  Kingdom of Bavaria (1806–1871)
  Bavarian Soviet Republic (1919)
  Bremen (1815–1871)
  Brunswick (1815–1871)
  Frankfurt (Free Imperial City of Frankfurt (HRE), before 1806; City of Frankfurt, 1815–1866)
  Hamburg (1189–1871)
  Kingdom of Hanover (1814–1866)
  Hesse-Homburg (1815–1866)
  Hesse-Kassel (or Hesse-Cassel) (Electorate, 1803–1807, 1813–1866)
  Hohenzollern-Hechingen (1623–1850)
  Hohenzollern-Sigmaringen (1623–1850)
  Holstein (1815–1864)
  Lippe (1123–1871)
  Lübeck (Free city 1226–1871)
  Mecklenburg-Schwerin (1815–1871)
  Mecklenburg-Strelitz (1815–1871)
  Nassau (1806–1866)
  Oldenburg (1815–1871)
  Pomerania (1121–1637)
  Prussia (1525–1871)
  Duchy of Prussia (1525–1618)
  Brandenburg-Prussia (1618–1701)
  Kingdom of Prussia (1701–1871)
  Reuss (1010–1806)
  Saxe-Altenburg (1602–1871)
  Saxe-Coburg-Saalfeld (1735–1826)
  Saxe-Coburg and Gotha (1826–1871)
  Saxe-Gotha (1640–1680)
  Saxe-Hildburghausen (1680–1826)
  Saxe-Lauenburg (or Duchy of Lauenburg) (1296–1871)
  Saxe-Meiningen (1680–1871)
  Saxe-Weimar-Eisenach (1809–1871)
  Saxony (kingdom) – 1806–1871)
  Schaumburg-Lippe (1647–1871)
  Schleswig (1058–1866)
  Schwarzburg-Rudolstadt (1599–1871)
  Schwarzburg-Sondershausen (1599–1871)
  Waldeck (1180–1871)
  Württemberg (kingdom) – 1806–1871)

 Free State of Bottleneck (1919–1923)

Switzerland 
  Old Swiss Confederacy (1300–1798)
  Helvetic Republic (1798–1803)
  Rhodanic Republic (1802–1810)

Italy

  Republic of Crema (1797)
  Republic of Alba (1796)
  Republic of Ancona (–1532)
  Republic of Florence (1115–1569)
  Kingdom of Naples (1282–1816)
  Duchy of Urbino (1443–1625)
  Anconine Republic (1797–1798)
  Judicate of Arborea (9th century–1420)
  Kingdom of Etruria (1801–1807)
  United Provinces of Central Italy (1859–1860)
  Cisalpine Republic (1797–1802)
  Cispadane Republic (1796–1797)
  Republic of Cospaia (1440–1826)
  Principality of Elba (Elba) (1814–1815)
  Kingdom of Etruria (1801–1807)
  Marquisate of Finale (967–1602)
  Regency of Carnaro (1919–1920)
  Gozitan Nation (1798–1801)
  Italian Republic (Napoleonic) (1802–1805)
  Kingdom of Italy (Napoleonic) (1805–1814)
  Kingdom of Lombardy–Venetia (1815–1866)
  Duchy of Lucca (1815–1847)
  Principality of Lucca and Piombino (1805–1814)
  Republic of Lucca (1160–1805)
  Sovereign Military Order of Malta (1530–1798)
  Duchy of Mantua (1273–1707)
  Duchy of Massa and Carrara (1473–1829)
  Duchy of Milan (1395–1797)
  Provisional Government of Milan (1848)
  Duchy of Modena (1452–1796, 1815–1859)
  Kingdom of Naples (1285–1816)
  Republic of Noli (1192–1797)
  Duchy of Parma (1545–1859)
  Papal States (752–1870)
  Republic of Pisa (–1406)
  Roman Republic (19th century) (1849)
  Kingdom of Sardinia (1324–1861)
  Republic of San Marco (1848–1849)
 Republic of Senarica (1343–1797)
  Kingdom of Sicily (1130–1816)
  Kingdom of Sicily (1848)
  Transpadane Republic (1796–1797)
  Grand Duchy of Tuscany (1569–1801, 1815–1859)
  Kingdom of the Two Sicilies (1815–1860)
  Republic of Venice (697–1797)
  Republic of Genoa (1095–1797)
  Italian protectorate of Albania (1939–1943)
  Italian governorate of Montenegro (1941–1943)
  Kingdom of Tavolara (1836-1934)
  Free Territory of Trieste (1947–1954)
  Republic of Rose Island (1968-1969)

Modern United Kingdom
  Kingdom of Gwynedd (450–1216)
  Kingdom of Powys (5th century–1160)
  Kingdom of Scotland (843–1707)
  England (927–1707)
  Angevin Empire (1154–1214)
  Principality of Wales (1216–1536)
  Commonwealth of England (1649–1653) and (1659–1660)
  The Protectorate (1653–1659)

Ireland
  Osraige (150–1541)
 Airgíalla (331–1585)
  Uí Maine (–1611)
 Ailech (450–1617)
  Tyrconnell (5th century–1607)
  Tír Eoghain (5th century–1607)
  Fermanagh (10th century–1607)
 Magh Luirg (–1585)
  Republic of Connacht
  Thomond (1118–1543)
  Kingdom of Desmond (1118–1596)
  Lordship of Ireland (1171–1542)
  Clandeboye (1283–1605)
 Kingdom of Uí Failghe (Unknown–1550)
  Kingdom of Leinster
  Kingdom of Connacht
  Kingdom of Ireland (1541–1801)
  Irish Catholic Confederation (1641–1649)
  Republic of Connacht (1798)
  Irish soviets (1919-1922)
  Limerick Soviet (1919)

Low Countries
  Prince-Bishopric of Liège (972–1795) annexed by France in 1795.
  Duchy of Brabant (1183–1794)
  Duchy of Bouillon (1456? – 1794)
  United Belgian States (1789–1790)
  Republic of the Seven United Netherlands (1581–1795) (Republiek der Zeven Verenigde Nederlanden/Provinciën) Independence from Spain after Eighty Years' War in 1581, conquered by France 1795.
  Batavian Republic (1795–1806) (Bataafse Republiek) France's vassal state.
  Kingdom of Holland (1806–1810) (Koninkrijk Holland/Royaume d'Hollande) Ruled by Louis Bonaparte, annexed by France 1810.
  Sovereign Principality of the United Netherlands (1813–1815)
  United Kingdom of the Netherlands (1815–1839)
  Neutral Moresnet (1816–1920)

Poland
  Duchy of Pomerania (1121–1160, 1264–1295, 1478–1531, 1625–1637)
 Demmin Principality (1160–1264)
 Szczecin Principality (1160–1264, 1295–1523)
  Duchy of Pomerania-Wolgast (1295–1478)
  Duchy of Masovia (1138–1275, 1294–1310, 1370–1381, 1495–1526)
  Duchy of Pomerania-Stolp (1368–1478)
 Duchy of Pomerania-Neustettin (1368–1390)
  Duchy of Kraków (1227–1320)
  Kingdom of Galicia–Volhynia (1199–1349)
  Duchy of Bytom (1281–1498)
  Duchy of Silesia (1138–1335)
  Duchy of Opole (1172–1202, 1281–1532)
  Duchy of Racibórz (1172–1202, 1281–1521)
  Duchy of Opole and Racibórz (1202–1281, 1521–1532, 1551–1556)
  Duchy of Inowrocław (1267–1364)
  Duchy of Teschen (1281–1918)
 Duchy of Poland (966–1025, 1031–1076, 1079–1138, 1138–1227)
  Kingdom of Poland (1025–1031, 1076–1079, 1295–1296, 1300–1320)
  United Kingdom of Poland (1320–1386)
  Polish–Lithuanian Commonwealth (1569–1795)
  Crown of the Kingdom of Poland (1386–1795)
  Grand Duchy of Lithuania (1236–1795)
  Royal Prussia (1466–1569)
  Duchy of Prussia (1525–1701)
  Duchy of Courland and Semigallia (1561–1795)
 New Courland (1637, 1639, 1642, 1654–1659, 1660–1666, 1680–1683, 1686–1690)
  Kingdom of Galicia and Lodomeria (1772–1918, part of the Austrian Empire, later part of the Austria-Hungary)
  Duchy of Warsaw (1807–1815; part of First French Empire, personal union with Kingdom of Saxony)
  Free, Independent, and Strictly Neutral City of Cracow with its Territory (1815–1846)
  Kingdom of Poland (1815–1832; personal union with Russian Empire)
  Vistula Land (1867–1915; part of the Russian Empire)
  Grand Duchy of Posen (1815–1848; part of Kingdom of Prussia)
  Grand Duchy of Kraków (1846–1918; part of the Austria-Hungary)
  Polish National Government (1830–1831)
  Polish National Government (1846)

  Polish National Government (1863–1864)
  Kingdom of Poland (1917–1918)
  Republic of Zakopane (1918)
  Republic of Tarnobrzeg (1918–1919)
  Komancza Republic (1918–1919)
  Lemko-Rusyn People's Republic (1918–1920)
  II Republic of Poland (1918–1939)
  Republic of Central Lithuania (1920–1922)
  Free City of Danzig (1920–1939)
  Provisional Polish Revolutionary Committee (1920)
  Military Administration in Poland (1939)
  General Governorate for the Occupied Polish Region (1939–1945)
  Polish Underground State (1939–1945)
  Polish Committee of National Liberation (1944)
  Provisional Government of the Republic of Poland (1944–1945)
  Provisional Government of National Unity (1945–1947)
  Republic of Poland (1947–1952)
  Polish People's Republic (1952–1989)
  Polish National-Territorial Region (1990–1991)

Ukraine
  Kholodny Yar Republic (1919-1922)
  Zaporozhian Sich (1552–1775)
  Cossack Hetmanate (1649–1764)
  Ukrainian People's Republic (1917–1920)
  Ukrainian State (1918)
  West Ukrainian People's Republic (1918–1919)
  Ukrainian Soviet Socialist Republic (1919–1991; sovereign until 1922)
  Makhnovshchina (1918–1921)
  Hutsul Republic (1919)
  Galician Soviet Socialist Republic (1920)
  Carpatho-Ukraine (1939)
  Ukrainian National Government (1941)

Crimea
  Principality of Theodoro (13th century–1475)
  Crimean Khanate (1449–1783)
  Crimean People's Republic (1917–1918)
  Crimean Autonomous Soviet Socialist Republic (1921–1941/1944–1945/1991–1992)

Baltic countries and Belarus
  Principality of Polotsk (10th century–1397)
  Grand Duchy of Lithuania (1236–1795)
  Kingdom of Lithuania (1918)
  Republic of Lithuania (1918–1940)
  Republic of Perloja (1918–1923)
  Republic of Central Lithuania (1920–1922)
  Lithuanian–Byelorussian Soviet Socialist Republic (1919)
  Belarusian People's Republic (1918–1919)
  Byelorussian Soviet Socialist Republic (1919–1922)
  State of the Teutonic Order (1230–1525)
  Kingdom of Livonia (1570–1578)
  United Baltic Duchy (1918)
  Latvian Socialist Soviet Republic (1918–1920)
  First Latvian Republic (1918–1940)
  Duchy of Courland and Semigallia (1918)
  Soviet Republic of Naissaar on an Estonian Baltic Sea island (1917–1918)
  Commune of the Working People of Estonia (1918–1919)
  First Estonian Republic (1918–1940)

Romania and Moldova
  Dacian Kingdom (168 BC–106 AD)
 Țara Litua (1247–1330)
 Voievodeship of Gelu (9th–11th century)
 Voivodeship of Maramureș (9th century–1402)
 Jupanat of Dimitrie (c. 943)
 Voivodeship of Glad (10th century)
 Voivodeship of Menumorut (9th-11th century)
 Jupanat of Gheorghe (10th century)
 Jupanat of Tatos (c. 1190)
 Jupanat of Sacea (11th century)
 Jupanat of Setslav (c. 1085)
  Voivodship of Transylvania (12th century-1541)
 Banat of Severin (1228-1526)
 Voivodship of Seneslav (13th century)
 Cnezatul lui Ioan (13th century)
 Cnezatul lui Farcaș (13th century)
  Principality of Wallachia (1330–1859)
  Principality of Moldavia (1346–1859)
  Principality of Transylvania (1570–1711)
  Wallachian Eyalet (1595)
  Temeşvar Eyalet (1552–1716)
  Varat Eyalet (1660–1692)
  Grand Principality of Transylvania (1711–1867)
  Banat of Temeswar (1718–1778)
  Duchy of Bukovina (1849–1918)
  United Principalities of Moldavia and Wallachia (1859–1881)
  Kingdom of Romania (1881–1947)
  Banat Republic (1918–1919)
  Moldavian Democratic Republic (1917–1918)

Russia
  Novgorod Republic (1136–1478)
  Pskov Republic (1348–1510)
  Principality of Tver (1246–1483)
 Principality of Beloozero (13th–15th century)
 Principality of Yaroslavl (1218–1463)
  Grand Duchy of Ryazan (1097–1521)
  Principality of Great Perm (1323–1505)
 Vyatka Land
  Golden Horde (1320–1547)
 Astrakhan Khanate (1466–1556)
  Khanate of Kazan (1438–1552)
 Qasim Khanate (1452–1681)
  Khanate of Sibir (1468–1598)
  Kalmyk Khanate (1630–1771)
  Republic of Uhtua (1918–1920)
  Kuban People's Republic (1918–1920)
  Don Republic (1918–1920)
  Idel-Ural State (1 March 1918 – 28 March 1918)
  Far Eastern Republic (1920–1922)
  Green Ukraine (1920–1922)
  Tungus Republic (1924–1925)
  State of Buryat-Mongolia (1917–1920)
  Grand Duchy of Moscow (1283–1547)
 Jaxa (1665–1674)
  Tsardom of Russia (1547–1721)
  Russian Empire (1721–1917)
  Kingdom of Poland (1815–1867)
  Grand Duchy of Finland (1809–1917)
  Petrograd Soviet of Workers' and Soldiers' Deputies (1917–1924)
  Russian Republic (1917)
  Russian Republic (1918)
  Russian State (1918–1920)
  Russian Soviet Federative Socialist Republic (1917–1922)
  Supreme Administration of the Northern Region (1918)
  Provisional Government of the Northern Region (1918–1920)
  Armed Forces of South Russia (1918–1919)
  Union of Soviet Socialist Republics (1922–1991)
  Armenian Soviet Socialist Republic (1922–1991)
  Azerbaijan Soviet Socialist Republic (1922–1991)
  Byelorussian Soviet Socialist Republic (1922–1991)
  Estonian Soviet Socialist Republic (1940–1991)
  Georgian Soviet Socialist Republic (1922–1991)
  Karelo-Finnish Soviet Socialist Republic (1940–1956)
  Kazakh Soviet Socialist Republic (1936–1991)
  Kirghiz Soviet Socialist Republic (1936–1991)
  Latvian Soviet Socialist Republic (1940–1990)
  Lithuanian Soviet Socialist Republic (1940–1990)
  Moldavian Soviet Socialist Republic (1940–1991)
  Pridnestrovian Moldavian Soviet Socialist Republic (1990–1991)
  Russian Soviet Federative Socialist Republic (1922–1991)
  Turkestan Autonomous Soviet Socialist Republic (1918–1924)
  Volga German Autonomous Soviet Socialist Republic (1918–1941)
  Bashkir Autonomous Soviet Socialist Republic (1919–1991)
  Tatar Autonomous Soviet Socialist Republic (1920–1990)
  Tatarstan (2022)
  Kazakh Autonomous Socialist Soviet Republic (1920–1936)
  Mountain Autonomous Soviet Socialist Republic (1921–1924)
  Dagestan Autonomous Soviet Socialist Republic (1921–1991)
  Crimean Autonomous Soviet Socialist Republic (1921–1945)
  Yakut Autonomous Soviet Socialist Republic (1922–1991)
  Buryat Autonomous Soviet Socialist Republic (1923–1990)
  Karelian Autonomous Soviet Socialist Republic (1923–1940; 1956–1991)
  Kirghiz Autonomous Socialist Soviet Republic (1926–1936)
  Mordovian Autonomous Soviet Socialist Republic (1934–1990)
  Udmurt Autonomous Soviet Socialist Republic (1934–1990)
  Kalmyk Autonomous Soviet Socialist Republic (1935–1943; 1957–1991)
  Checheno-Ingush Autonomous Soviet Socialist Republic (1936–1944; 1957–1991)
  Kabardino-Balkarian Autonomous Soviet Socialist Republic (1936–1944; 1957–1991)
  Komi Autonomous Soviet Socialist Republic (1936–1991)
  Mari Autonomous Soviet Socialist Republic (1936–1991)
  North Ossetian Autonomous Soviet Socialist Republic (1936–1992)
  Karelian Autonomous Soviet Socialist Republic (1923–1940; 1956–1991)
  Kabardin Autonomous Soviet Socialist Republic (1944–1957)
  Tuvan Autonomous Soviet Socialist Republic (1961–1992)
  Khakas Autonomous Oblast (1990–1991)
  Gorno-Altai Autonomous Soviet Socialist Republic (1990–1991)
  Tajik Soviet Socialist Republic (1929–1991)
  Turkmen Soviet Socialist Republic (1924–1991)
  Ukrainian Soviet Socialist Republic (1922–1991)
  Uzbek Soviet Socialist Republic (1924–1991)

Hungary
  Principality of Hungary (895–1000)
  Kingdom of Hungary (1000–1804)
  Eastern Hungarian Kingdom (1526–1551, 1556–1570)
  Principality of Transylvania (1570–1711)
  Principality of Upper Hungary (1682–1685)
  Principality of Transylvania (1711–1804)
  Kingdom of Croatia (1102–1526)
  Kingdom of Hungary (1301–1526)
  Hungarian State (1849)

Czech Republic and Slovakia
  Duchy of Bohemia (–1198)
  Kingdom of Bohemia (1198–1918)
  Margraviate of Moravia (1182–1918)
  Slovak Soviet Republic (1919)
  Slovak Republic (1939–1945)
  First Czechoslovak Republic (1918–1938)
  Second Czechoslovak Republic (1938–1939)
  Third Czechoslovak Republic (1945–1948)
  Czechoslovak Socialist Republic (1948–1989; before 1960 as Czechoslovak Republic)
  Czech and Slovak Federative Republic (1990–1992)

Austria
  Duchy of Austria (1156–1453)
  Archduchy of Austria (1453–1804)
  Austrian Empire (1804–1867)
  Austria-Hungary (1867–1918)
  Kingdom of Croatia-Slavonia (1868–1918)

Balkans
 In Albania:
  Independent Albania (1912–1914)
 Autonomous Republic of Northern Epirus (1914)
  Republic of Central Albania (1913–1914)
  Principality of Albania (1914–1925)
  Italian protectorate over Albania (1917–1920)
  Republic of Mirdita (1921)
  Italian protectorate of Albania (1939–1943)
  German occupation of Albania (1943–1944)
 In Aromanian:
  First Hellenic Republic (1828–1832)
 Areopagus of Eastern Continental Greece (1821-1825)
  Kingdom of Greece (1832–1924, 1935–1941, 1944–1974)
  Italian Islands of the Aegean (1912–1945)
 In Bosnia:
  Kingdom of Bosnia (1377–1463)
  Kingdom of Bosnia (1377–1463)
  Condominium of Bosnia and Herzegovina (1878–1918)
  Republic of Bosnia and Herzegovina (1992–1995)
  Autonomous Province of Western Bosnia (1993–1995)
  Republika Srpska (1992–1995)
  Croatian Republic of Herzeg-Bosnia (1991–1996)
 In Bulgaria:
  Second Bulgarian Empire (1185–1396)
  Despotate of Dobruja (1356–1411)
  Principality of Bulgaria (1878–1908)
  Strandzha Commune (1903)
 In Croatia:
  Kingdom of Croatia (1527–1868)
  Kingdom of Slavonia (1699–1868)
  Kingdom of Croatia-Slavonia (1868–1918)
  Free State of Fiume (1920–1924)
  Independent State of Croatia (1941–1945)
  Free Territory of Trieste (1947–1954)
  Republic of Ragusa (1358–1808)
  Republic of Serbian Krajina (1991–1995)
 In Greece:
  First Hellenic Republic (1828–1832)
 Areopagus of Eastern Continental Greece (1821-1825)
  Kingdom of Greece (1832–1924, 1935–1941, 1944–1974)
  United States of the Ionian Islands (1815–1864)
  Septinsular Republic (1800–1815)
  Principality of Samos (1815–1864)
  Cretan State (1898–1913)
  Free State of Ikaria (1912)
  Italian Islands of the Aegean (1912–1945)
 In Montenegro:
  Prince-Bishopric of Montenegro (1516–1852)
  Principality of Montenegro (1852–1910)
  Kingdom of Montenegro (1910–1918)
  Italian governorate of Montenegro (1941–1943)
  German-occupied territory of Montenegro (1943–1944)
 In North Macedonia:
  Kruševo Republic (1903)
  Independent Macedonia (1944) [proposed]
 In Serbia:
  Revolutionary Serbia (1804–1813)
  Principality of Serbia (1815–1882)
  Kingdom of Serbia (1882–1918)
  State of Slovenes, Croats and Serbs (1918)
  Kingdom of Yugoslavia (1929–1943)
  Socialist Federal Republic of Yugoslavia (1943–1992)
  (1992–2003)
  (2003–2006)
  Republic of Kosova (1991-1999)
 In Turkey:
  Byzantine Empire (395–1453)
  Duchy of Athens (1205–1458)
 Despotate of Epirus (1356–1479)
 Empire of Nicaea (1204–1261)
  Ottoman Empire (–1922/1923)
  Government of the Grand National Assembly (1920–1923)

Caucasus
  Caucasian Albania (2nd century BC–8th century AD)
  Kabardia (–)
  Circassia (13th century–1864)
 Kingdom of Abkhazia (778–1008)
 Elisu Sultanate (1604–1844)
  Avar Khanate (13th century–1864)
  Caucasian Imamate (1828–1859)
  Mountainous Republic of the Northern Caucasus (1917–1921)
  North Caucasian Emirate (1919–1920)
  Chechen Republic of Ichkeria (1991–2000)
  Kingdom of Georgia (1008–1490)
  Kingdom of Imereti (1260–1810)
  Principality of Svaneti (1463–1858)
  Principality of Mingrelia (1557–1867)
  Principality of Guria (1460–1829)
 Samtskhe-Saatabago (1266–1625)
 Kingdom of Kartli (1478–1762)
  Kingdom of Kakheti (1465–1762)
  Kingdom of Kartli-Kakheti (1762–1801)
  Democratic Republic of Georgia (1918–1921)
  First Republic of Armenia (1918–1920)
  Republic of Mountainous Armenia (April 1921–July 1921)
  Republic of Aras (1918–1919)
  Centrocaspian Dictatorship (1918)
  Military Dictatorship of Mughan (1918–1919)
  Democratic Republic of Azerbaijan (1918–1920)
  Transcaucasian Democratic Federative Republic (February 1918–May 1918)

Iberian Peninsula
  Emirate of Córdoba (756-929)
  Kingdom of Asturias (718–924)
  Kingdom of León (910–1230)
  Republic of Galicia (1931)
  Couto Misto (10th century–1868)
  Asturian Socialist Republic (October 1934)
  Kingdom of Navarre (824–1620)
  First Catalan Republic (1641-1652)
  Revolutionary Catalonia (1936–1939)
  Second Catalan Republic (1931)
  Crown of Aragon (1162–1479)
  Emirate of Granada (1238–1492)
  Kingdom of Majorca (1231–1715 (1349))
  Principality of Catalonia (12th century – 1714/1833)
  United Kingdom of Portugal, Brazil and the Algarves (1815–1825)
  Kingdom of Portugal (Monarchy of the North) (1919)
  Ditadura Nacional (1926–1933)
  Crown of Castile (1230–1479)
  Kingdom of Galicia (410–1833)
  Kingdom of Castile (1065–1230/1715)
 Iberian Union (1580–1640)
  Third Catalan Republic (2017)

North America

Anguilla 
  Republic of Anguilla (1967–1969)

Canada 
  Republic of Madawaska (1827)
  Republic of Canada (1837–1838)
  Republic of Lower Canada (1838)
  Miꞌkmaꞌki (1867)
  Republic of Manitoba (1867–1870)
  Provisional Government of Saskatchewan (1885)
  Dominion of Newfoundland (1907–1949)

Dominican Republic 
  Republic of Spanish Haiti (1821–1822)
  First Dominican Republic (1844–1861)

Guatemala 
  United Provinces of Central America
  State of Los Altos (1838–1840), (1848–1849)

Haiti 
  First Empire of Haiti (1804–1806)
  State of Haiti (1806–1811)
  Kingdom of Haiti (1811–1820)

Mexico 
  Toltec Empire (674 (disputed)–1122 (disputed)
  Cocollán (1100–1521)
 Aztec Empire (1428–1521)
 Zapotec civilization (–1521)
  Northern America (1813)
  First Mexican Empire (1821–1823)
  Provisional Government of Mexico (1823–1824)
  First Mexican Republic (1824–1835)
  Republic of the Rio Grande (1840)
  Centralist Republic of Mexico (1835–1846)
  Republic of Yucatán (1841–1848)
  Second Federal Republic of Mexico (1846–1863)
  Republic of Sonora (1853–1854)
  Republic of Baja California (1853–1854)

United States 
  Iroquois Confederacy (between 1450 and 1660–1867)
  Cherokee Nation (1794–1865)
  Vermont Republic (1777–1791)
  State of Muskogee (1799–1803)
  Republic of West Florida (1810)
  Republic of East Florida (1812)
  Republic of the Floridas (1817)
 Republic of Indian Stream (1832–1835)
  Republic of Texas (1836–1846)
  State of Deseret (1849–1850)
  California Republic (June 14 – July 9, 1846)
  The Great Republic of Rough and Ready (1850)
  Palmetto Republic (1860-1861)
  Alabama Republic (1861)
  Republic of Louisiana (1861)
  Republic of Mississippi (1861-1865)
  Confederate States of America (1861–1865)
  Republic of Puerto Rico (1868-1898)

Oceania

  Tuʻi Tonga Empire (–1865)
 Kingdom of ʻUvea (15th century–1887)
 Kingdom of Alo
 Kingdom of Sigave
  Mangareva (1881)
  Kingdom of Bora Bora (till 1888 or 1895)
  Kingdom of Raiatea (till 1888, French protectorate since 1880)
  Kingdom of Huahine (till 1895, French protectorate since 1888)
  Kingdom of Tahiti (1788/91–1880, French protectorate since 1842)
  Kingdom of Rurutu (till 1900, French protectorate since 1888)
  Kingdom of Rimatara (till 1901, French protectorate since 1888)
  Kingdom of Tahuata (till 1880, French protectorate since 1842)
  Kingdom of Rapa Iti (till 1881, kingship continued to 1887)
 Kingdom of Mangareva (till 1881, French protectorate since 1844/1871)
 Taiohae Kingdom of Nuku Hiva (till 1901, sovereignty ceded to France in 1842)
  Kingdom of Tuamotu
  Kingdom of Fiji (1871–1874)
  Dominion of Fiji (1970–1987)
  Kingdom of Hawaii (1795–1893)
  Provisional Government of Hawaii (1893–1894)
  Republic of Hawaii (1894–1898)
 Patu-iki or Kingdom of Niue (–1900)
  Kingdom of Rarotonga (1858–1893)
 Saudeleur dynasty
  Kingdom of Rapa Nui (Easter Island) (till 1888)
 Kingdom of Nauru (till 1888)
  People's Provisional Government of Vanuatu (1977–1978)

South America

Argentina 
  United Provinces of the Río de la Plata (1810–1831)
  Argentine Confederation (1831–1861)
  Republic of Entre Ríos (1820–1821)
  Republic of Tucumán (1820–1821)
  State of Buenos Aires (1852–1861)
  Kingdom of Araucanía and Patagonia (1860–1862)

Bolivia 
  State of Upper Peru (1825)
  Republic of Bolivar (1825)
  Republic of Alto Perú (1828)
  Bolivian Republic (1836–1839)
  Peru-Bolivian Confederation (1836–1839)

Brazil 
  (1899–1900; 1903)
  (1822–1889)
  Confederation of the Equator (1824)
  Riograndense Republic (1836–1845)
  Juliana Republic (1839)
  Republic of Counani (1886–1891)
  Principality of Trindad (1893-1895)

Chile 
  Kingdom of Chile (1810–1814)
  New State of Chile (1819–1826)
  Conservative Republic (1830–1861)
  Kingdom of Araucania and Patagonia (1862)

Colombia 
 Muisca Confederation (1450–1537)
  Free and Independent State of Cundinamarca (1810–1815)
  Confederate Cities of Valle del Cauca (1811–1815)
  United Provinces of New Granada (1811–1816)
  Gran Colombia (1819–1831)

Ecuador 
  State of Quito (1809-1812) Estado de Quito
  Free Province of Guayaquil (1820-1822)

 Paraguay 
  El Stronato (1954–1989)

 Peru 
 Kingdom of Chimor (–1470)
 Inca Empire (1438–1533)
  Protectorate of Peru (1821–1822)
  Republic of South Peru (1836–1839)
  Republic of North Peru (1836–1839)
  Peru-Bolivian Confederation (1836–1839)
  Peruvian Republic (1837)
  Peruvian Republic (1838–1839)
 Federal State of Loreto (1896)
 Jungle Nation (1899–1900)

 Uruguay 
  Liga Federal (1815–1820)

 Venezuela 
  Supreme Junta (1810-1811)
  First Republic of Venezuela (1811–1812)
  Second Republic of Venezuela (1813–1814)
  Third Republic of Venezuela (1817–1819)

Modern states and territories by type

Dismembered countries
These states are now dissolved into a number of states, none of which retain the old name.
  – Dissolved in 1945, its former territory now consists of the entirety of the countries of Austria and Germany, and parts of what is now Belarus, the Czech Republic, France, Luxembourg, Poland, Russia, Belgium, the Netherlands, Denmark, Norway, Greece, Serbia, Estonia, Latvia, Lithuania, Ukraine and Slovenia.
  – Polity existed to 7 December 1949 and its territory now controlled by the People's Republic of China (Mainland China), Mongolia, portion of the territory claimed by India and Japan, and parts of Afghanistan, Bhutan, Pakistan, Russia and Tajikistan. The rump state, still known as the "Republic of China", continues to control Taiwan and Penghu which was acquired from Japan in 1945, as well as Kinmen and Matsu Islands, forming part of the rump Fujian Province. See also the political status of Taiwan and the Theory of the Undetermined Status of Taiwan.
  – Ceased to exist in 1910, its former territory now consists of the entirety of territory controlled by North Korea and South Korea, and a portion of territory claimed by Japan.
  Mali Federation – In 1959 formed by Senegal and French Sudan, both parts of French West Africa, as an independent nation. It collapsed in 1960, and is now Senegal and Mali.
  Portugal, Brazil and the Algarves (Reino Unido de Portugal, Brasil e Algarves) created in 1815 when Brazil was upgraded to the rank of kingdom, once the Portuguese royal family was living in Rio de Janeiro since 1809. This country was dissolved in 1822 when Brazil became independent. Now the countries of Portugal, Brazil, Cabo Verde, São Tomé and Príncipe, Angola, East Timor and Mozambique.
  – Dissolved in 2006, now the countries of Montenegro, Serbia, and the partially recognized Kosovo.
  – Dissolved in 1991, now the countries of Armenia, Azerbaijan, Belarus, Georgia, Kazakhstan, Kyrgyzstan, Moldova, Russia, Tajikistan, Turkmenistan, Ukraine, and Uzbekistan. The Baltic countries occupied by USSR until 1991 (Estonia, Latvia and Lithuania) were not considered by most Western countries de jure part of the USSR.
  United Arab Republic – A union formed by Egypt and Syria in 1958. It was dissolved in 1961, though Egypt used the name until 1971. Other Pan-Arab unity agreements with Iraq and Jordan in the 1950s failed.
 United Arab States – A confederation formed by the United Arab Republic and North Yemen in 1958; it was dissolved in 1961.
  – Dissolved in 1991 and 1992, now the countries of Bosnia and Herzegovina, Croatia, Montenegro, North Macedonia, Serbia, Slovenia, and the partially recognized Kosovo.
  – Existed from 1918 to 1992, the country wasn't active in World War II, but the government was in exile, dissolved in 1992 and broke up into Czechia and Slovakia.
  – Existed from 1821 to 1841, broke up into Guatemala, Belize, El Salvador, Honduras, Nicaragua, and Costa Rica.
  Somali Republic – Dissolved in 1991, now the countries of Somalia and unrecognized Somaliland.
  – An empire created after Brazil declared its independence in 1822 and dissolved in 1889, now the countries of Brazil and Uruguay (who declared their independence in 1825, and was recognized in 1828).

Nominally independent homelands of South Africa
Four of the homelands, or bantustans, for black South Africans, were granted nominal independence by the apartheid regime of South Africa. Not recognised by other nations, these effectively were puppet states and were re-incorporated in 1994.
  Bophuthatswana – Declared independent in 1977, reincorporated in 1994.
  Ciskei – Declared independent in 1981, reincorporated in 1994.
  Transkei – Declared independent in 1976, reincorporated in 1994.
  Venda – Declared independent in 1979, reincorporated in 1994.

Secessionist states
These nations declared themselves independent, but failed to achieve it in fact or did not seek permanent independence and were either re-incorporated into the mother country or incorporated into another country.
  Carpatho-Ukraine – declared independence from Czechoslovakia in 1939, but was occupied and annexed by Hungary in one day.
 Cartagena Canton – the haven city of Cartagena, Spain seceded from the First Spanish Republic in 1873.
  Catalan Republic (April 14–17, 1931).
  Chechnya – Virtually independent from Russia from 1996 as Chechen Republic of Ichkeria, however the country was recognized only by the Taliban. After terrorist attacks in 1999 the republic was returned to Russia's control in the Second Chechen War.
  – Occupied the southeastern United States, stretching from Texas to Virginia. Declared secession from the U.S. in 1861, reintegrated into the U.S. in 1865. Reconstruction ended in 1876 and U.S. troops withdrew as an occupation force in 1877. South Carolina was the first state to declare its secession from the United States, doing so on December 20, 1860. Political factions in the "border states" of Kentucky and Missouri declared themselves parts of the Confederacy and controlled small portions of those regions early in the war. The major Indian tribes in Oklahoma signed an alliance with the Confederacy, and participated in its military efforts against the U.S.
  Crimean Autonomous Soviet Socialist Republic, declared independence from Ukraine in 1992 but soon settled for being an autonomous republic within Ukraine.
 Cruzob, achieved independence from Mexico in 1856, but was reannexed in 1901.
  Green Ukraine – Declared independence from Far Eastern Republic in 1920, dissolved in 1922.
  Herzeg-Bosnia – Separated from Bosnia and Herzegovina in 1992, reincorporated into the country in 1994.
  Italian Social Republic (1943–1945)
  Katanga – Declared its independence of the newly formed Democratic Republic of the Congo in 1960, was incorporated again into the country in 1963.
 Manitoba – short-lived republic led by Thomas Spence, declared after the Hudson's Bay Company gave up Rupert's Land and before the government of Canada took control (1867).
  Red River Rebellion – provisional government in Rupert's Land, led by Louis Riel in (1869–1870).
  Serbian Krajina – declared independence from Croatia in 1991, reincorporated into the country in 1995.
  South Kasai – declared independence from the Democratic Republic of the Congo in June 1960, reincorporated into the country in December 1961.
  Supreme Administration of Northern Region – Proclaimed independent in 1918, later became the Provisional Government of the Northern Region.
  – Separated from Bosnia and Herzegovina in 1992, reincorporated into the country in 1995.
  Principality of Trinidad – Declared independence in 1893, claimed by United Kingdom in 1895, but incorporated by Brazil.
  Western Bosnia – Declared independence from Bosnia and Herzegovina in 1993 and reincorporated into it in 1995.

Annexed countries
These nations, once separate, are now part of another country. Cases of voluntary accession are included.
  Regency of Carnaro in 1919 and  Free State of Fiume 1920–1924, two short-lived states in the port city of Fiume/Rijeka proclaimed by Gabriele D'Annunzio. Following World War I, the city was disputed between Italy and Yugoslavia, and eventually captured by Italy in 1921. The city passed to Yugoslavia after World War II and is now in Croatia.
  Couto Misto – Tiny 10th century border territory that was split between Spain and Portugal in 1864–8.
  Crete – Autonomous under Ottoman suzerainty in 1898, unilaterally declared union with Greece in 1908, which was recognized in 1913.
  – Annexed by West Germany in 1990 and now part of Germany.
  – Merged with Scotland to form the Kingdom of Great Britain in 1707, now part of the United Kingdom.
  Franceville (1889–1890) – Independent in 1889, later governed by France and Britain as part of the New Hebrides; now part of Vanuatu.
  Hatay – Part of the Mandate of Syria that became part of Turkey; independent 1938–1939
  – Annexed by the U.S. in the late 19th century.
  Kalat (1638, 1666–1955) – 1666 to 1955, became part of Pakistan.
 Free States of Menton and Roquebrune – Seceded from Monaco in 1848, under nominal protection of the Kingdom of Sardinia, then annexed by France in 1861.
  Moresnet – 1816–1920, Tiny European territory that endured for a hundred years before definitively becoming part of Belgium.
  Natalia Republic – 1839–1843, Was quickly made into a British colony
  Islands of Refreshment – The islands of Tristan da Cunha were settled in 1810 and declared independence in 1811. Annexed by the United Kingdom in 1815.
  – Merged with England to form the Kingdom of Great Britain in 1707, now part of the United Kingdom.
  – Occupied by North Vietnam in 1975 and annexed into it in 1976.
  Islamic Republic of Tatarstan – Existed from 1992 until annexed by Russia in 1994.
  – Now part of South Africa.
  – Annexed by the U.S. in 1845.
  Vermont Republic – Annexed by the US in 1791.

See also

 
 
 
 
 
 
 
 
 
 
 List of pre-modern states
 
 
 
 
 
 
 
 
 
 
 

Notes

 References 

Further reading
 Berge, Bjørn. Nowherelands: An Atlas of Vanished Countries 1840–1975. New York: Thames & Hudson, 2017  240p.
 Harding, Les. Dead Countries of the Nineteenth and Twentieth Centuries: Aden to Zululand''. Scarecrow Press, 1998. 

Sovereign States
Lists of non-sovereign nations